Prikamsky is a rural locality (a settlement) and the administrative center of Olkhovskoye Rural Settlement, Chaykovsky, Perm Krai, Russia. The population was 1,252 as of 2010. There are 15 streets.

Geography 
Prikamsky is located 9 km southwest of Chaykovsky. Olkhovka is the nearest rural locality.

References 

Rural localities in Chaykovsky urban okrug